Zaradel Synagogue is a synagogue in Alexandria, Egypt.

See also
History of the Jews in Egypt
List of synagogues in Egypt

Synagogues in Alexandria